The Canterbury Astrolabe Quadrant is a medieval astrolabe believed to date from 1388, and which was found in an archaeological dig at the House of Agnes, a bed and breakfast hotel in Canterbury, Kent, England in 2005.

The Canterbury Astrolabe Quadrant is the only one of its kind known to definitely have been made in England. Astrolabes are calculation instruments that enable their users to tell the time and determine their geographical latitude using the position of the sun and stars. An extremely rare instrument, the Canterbury Astrolabe Quadrant probably belonged to a travelling scholar who may have lost it in Canterbury while on pilgrimage to that city.

It is also the first astrolabe to have been found during an archaeological dig. Scientific instruments such as this are usually handed down from generation to generation or found among family possessions, but are rarely discovered in the ground.

The British Museum was originally outbid in an auction in 2007 for the brass astrolabe, but succeeded in having an export ban imposed on the device, one of only eight such instruments to have survived from the Middle Ages. The British Museum eventually purchased it in 2008 with £175,000 from The British Museum Friends plus grants of £125,000 from the National Heritage Memorial Fund and £50,000 from The Art Fund.

Andrew Burnett, Deputy Director of the British Museum, said, "It is wonderful that we have been able to acquire this unique object... The quadrant will be a very important addition to our medieval collection as an object which can explain the sophistication of science in the Middle Ages and the transfer of knowledge between Muslim, Jewish and Christian communities."

See also
List of astronomical instruments

References

External links
The Astrolabe on Curator & Collector

Archaeological artifacts
Medieval European objects in the British Museum
1388 in England
Medieval European metalwork objects